"Message to My Girl" is a song by New Zealand art rock group Split Enz. It was released in January 1984 as the second single from their ninth studio album Conflicting Emotions.

In 2001 the song was voted by members of APRA as the 36th best New Zealand song of the 20th century.

During the 2006 Split Enz tour, Neil dedicated the song to his wife Sharon.

Track listing
"Message to My Girl" – 4:01
"Kia Kaha (Ever Be Strong)" – 3:35

Personnel
 Neil Finn – vocals, piano, guitar
 Noel Crombie – vocals, percussion
 Nigel Griggs – vocals, bass
 Eddie Rayner – keyboards
 Ricky Fataar – drums

Charts

Weekly charts

Year-end charts

ENZSO Version

When Split Enz member Eddie Rayner collaborated with the New Zealand Symphony Orchestra for the project ENZSO in 1995, they made a song cover and Finn once again provided the leading vocals. The re-recording was converted into more of a ballad version than the original.

Track listing
"Message to My Girl" - Performed by Neil Finn
"Stranger Than Fiction" - Performed by Tim Finn, Neil Finn and Sam Hunt
"Time for a Change" - Performed by Tim Finn

Charts

Notes

External resources
Chords

APRA Award winners
Split Enz songs
1984 singles
Songs written by Neil Finn
1983 songs
Mushroom Records singles
1995 singles
Enzso songs